is a village located in Aomori Prefecture, Japan. , the village has an estimated population of 2,192 in 895 households and a population density of 15 persons per km² (42 people per square mile).

Geography
Shingō is in south-central Aomori Prefecture, east of Lake Towada. The western edge of the village borders Akita Prefecture. Much of the village is mountainous with the outer ring mountains of Lake Towada, including Mt. Okomagatake and Mt. Toraidake. The village area extends along National Route 454, which connects Hachinohe, Aomori Prefecture and Lake Towada.

Neighboring municipalities
Aomori Prefecture
Towada
Sannohe District
Gonohe
Nanbu
Sannohe
Akita Prefecture
Kazuno

Climate
The village has a cold humid continental climate characterized by cool short summers and long cold winters with very heavy snowfall (Köppen climate classification Dfa).

Demographics
Per Japanese census data, the population of Shingō has declined steadily over the past 70 years.

History
The area around Shingō was controlled by the Nanbu clan of Morioka Domain during the Edo period. During the post-Meiji Restoration establishment of the modern municipalities system on 1 April 1889,  Herai Village and neighboring Nozawa Village were formed. On July 29, 1955, the western portion of Nozawa Village merged into Herai, which was then renamed Shingō.

Government
Shingō has a mayor-council form of government with a directly elected mayor and a unicameral village council of eight members. Shingō is part of Sannohe District which contributes three members to the Aomori Prefectural Assembly. In terms of national politics, the village is part of Aomori 2nd district of the House of Representatives of the National Diet.

Education
Shingō has one public elementary school, one public middle school, and a preschool operated by the village government. The village does not have a high school.

Economy
The economy of Shingō is heavily dependent on agriculture. Notable crops include garlic, edible chrysanthemum, Japanese yam and tobacco. Traditionally a horse breeding area, Shingō is also known for its cattle ranches.

Transportation

Railway
The village has no passenger railway service. The nearest train station is JR East Hachinohe Station, served by the Tohoku Shinkansen and Hachinohe Lines, and the Aoimori Railway Aoimori Railway Line.

Highway

Alleged tomb of Jesus

According to these ahistorical claims, Jesus Christ did not die on the cross at Golgotha. Instead, a man alleged to be his brother, Isukiri, took his place on the cross, while Jesus escaped across Siberia to Mutsu Province, in northern Japan. Once in Japan, Jesus changed his name to Torai Tora Daitenku and became a garlic farmer. In Japan, Jesus allegedly married a woman named Miyuko, with whom he fathered three children, all daughters. The eldest daughter married into the Sawaguchi family, which is claimed to hold a direct lineage to Jesus, evidenced by certain non-Japanese physical characteristics. After his death at an age exceeding 100, Jesus was said to have been interred into one of two grave mounds in the village. A remnant of the crucified Isukiri, typically thought to be a lock of hair, is allegedly buried in the other mound.

Few people seem to believe in the legend at face value, especially as many of the details come from the controversial , which are believed by most scholars to be a hoax. These documents report that Jesus studied Buddhism in Japan in the time between his childhood and the start of his ministry, and that his teachings in the New Testament were rooted in ancient Buddhist wisdom. These documents were reportedly destroyed during World War II, making verification of their authenticity impossible. Some theorize that the legend originated from 17th century Jesuit missionaries. Following the outlawing of Christianity in Japan, these missionaries, as well as Japanese Catholic converts, were persecuted and driven into hiding. 

A Christian church, repurposed into a Legend of Christ Museum, currently sits at the Tomb of Christ site in Shingō and can be visited for a ¥100 entrance fee. This museum includes displays and artifacts detailing the different elements of the legend and daily life in Shingō over history. The museum claims that many of the unique customs of the village, like the now-lost custom of drawing a cross on the forehead of infants, come directly from the teachings and direction of Jesus. Each year, a festival is held at the site on the first Sunday of June. Thousands of pilgrims and tourists travel to the site annually, making it the small village's primary source of tourism.

References

External links

Official Website 

 
Alleged tombs of Jesus
Villages in Aomori Prefecture
Christianity in Japan
Denial of the crucifixion of Jesus